Marloth Park is a holiday town situated in northeastern South Africa in the Mpumalanga province (formerly Eastern Transvaal).

Geography
On the  bank of the Crocodile River between Malelane and Komatipoort on the N4 national highway, Marloth Park is a wildlife sanctuary and holiday town. It boasts four of the “Big Five” with the exception of elephant. Buffalo, rhino and lion are confined to Marloth's game reserve "Lionspruit"; the rest of the game such as kudu, zebra, giraffe, blue wildebeest, nyala, impala, warthog, ostrich and others aren't restricted by fences and roam freely between the units that are built on 3000 ha.

On the southern boundary of the Kruger National Park, Crocodile Bridge gate is 14 km and Malelane gate 35 km from Marloth Park.

History 
The name Marloth Park derives from a German botanist, Rudolf Marloth. The Aloe marlothii was named after him. This plant is found abundantly in the lowveld.

Marloth Park was founded in 1977.

Tourism 
Marloth Park is a stopover point for tourists travelling to the Kruger National Park, to Mozambique or to Eswatini. Many lodges and private houses are found inside the Park.

Marloth Park is a unique project. It opened in 1972 as a holiday township, though a large part of the park remained natural. There are no internal fences and the vegetation remains in its original state. Marloth Park is separated by a boundary fence and by the Crocodile River from Kruger Park. Within the park, there are giraffe, wildebeest, kudu, zebra, impala, bushbuck, warthog, baboon, vervet monkey and other small game and a rich bird life. Meanwhile, the infrastructure of the natural park is well developed.

Inside Marloth Park (3,000 hectares), the freedom of movement is remarkable. Tourists can ride a bicycle or go for a walk on their own through the African bush. Movement is not confined to the housing units. While walking along the Crocodile River, visitors can watch spectacular wildlife scenes in the adjacent Kruger National Park. Local restaurants, shops and a filling station are easily accessible.

Sometimes, lions from Kruger Park roam into Marloth Park.

Climate
Marloth Park features a humid subtropical climate with mild winters and hot summers.

Notable residents
 , french writer.
 , south african writer.

References

External links

 Marloth Park Web Site Home Page
 Marloth Park safaris site 
 Marloth Park  honorary rangers site 

 Marloth Park Weather Site
 Marloth Park Property Owners Association

Populated places in the Nkomazi Local Municipality
1972 establishments in South Africa